Beyond the Valley of the Gift Police is the fourth spoken word album by Jello Biafra.  The album included a cartoon tract insert by graphic novelist Daniel Clowes, Devil Doll?, which spoofed the Chick Publications tracts. The album cover is a reproduction of a painting by Sandow Birk.

Track listing

Disc one

Disc two

Disc three

References

1994 albums
Alternative Tentacles albums
Jello Biafra albums
Spoken word albums by American artists